Edward Kaplan may refer to:

 Edward H. Kaplan, professor of operations research
 Edward L. Kaplan (1920–2006), mathematician